Color Change! is Crystal Kay's eighth studio album and was released on August 6, 2008. The album peaked at #6 on the Oricon daily chart and at #8 on the weekly chart. The album includes songs produced by Jimmy Jam & Terry Lewis ("Itoshiihito" and "I Can't Wait") and Bloodshy & Avant ("It's a Crime"). First pressings included a DVD which contained music videos for "Namida no Saki ni", "Shining" and "Dream World", from her previous album, All Yours. The title Color Change! refers to Kay's graduation in 2008. The album was eventually certified gold by RIAJ. Color Change! was the 289th best selling album of 2008 in Japan.

Track listing

Charts

Release history

References 

2008 albums
Albums produced by Bloodshy & Avant
Crystal Kay albums
Epic Records albums